Victor Haghani (born c. 1962) is an Iranian-American founder of Elm Wealth, a research-driven wealth advisor and manager. Elm uses index-tracking funds to invest across the largest asset classes and tries to give its clients broad exposure to global economic growth at the lowest possible cost.

Haghani was one of the founding partners of Long-Term Capital Management (LTCM), a hedge fund which collapsed in 1998 and was eventually recapitalized and restructured by a consortium of leading banks.

The son of an Iranian international trader of a Sephardic Jewish family, Haghani graduated from the London School of Economics (LSE). He was a founding partner of LTCM and after the liquidation of LTCM became a founding partner of JWM Partners which managed a successor fund to LTCM.

Education 
Victor Haghani graduated from the London School of Economics (LSE) in 1984, where he received a B.Sc. degree in Economics. He has also taught at the LSE, where he is a Senior Research Associate in the FMG.

Career 
Haghani started his career in 1984 in the bond research department of Salomon Brothers and then became a managing director in the bond arbitrage group run by John Meriwether. In 1993, he co-founded Long-Term Capital Management with seven other partners. In 1993, he set up the LTCM office in London. Haghani stayed on at LTCM through 1999 to assist in the liquidation of LTCM, following which he became a founding partner of JWM Partners, which managed a successor fund to LTCM. Since then, he has been involved in a variety of activities, including consulting and board assignments, becoming a name at Lloyd's of London and learning how to fly an airplane. Most recently, he has been conducting research into asset allocation and low cost wealth management strategies. Elm Partners was founded in 2011 to put those ideas into practice.

References 

hilibrand

Living people
Alumni of the London School of Economics
American people of Iranian-Jewish descent
Long-Term Capital Management
Year of birth missing (living people)